Ebara Corporation is a publicly traded manufacturing company based in Tokyo, Japan which makes environmental and industrial machinery such as pumps and turbines. It is the owner of the Elliott Company in the United States and Sumoto S.r.l. in Italy.

Ebara is divided into three main divisions:
Fluid Machinery & Systems Company, which produces:
Pumps: standard and engineered pumps and pumping system engineering
Turbines: Gas and steam turbines of various sizes, including micro gas turbines
Turbo-compressors, blowers, and fans
Chillers
Precision Machinery Company which produces:
CMP, Plating, and Cleaning systems
Dry vacuum and turbo-molecular pumps
Gas scrubber systems
Ozonized water generators
Chemical filters
Environmental Engineering Company, which produces:
Water treatment and sewage and industrial wastewater systems
Solid waste processing/utilization systems
Gas treatment systems
Environmental remediation services
Plant operation & maintenance services

See also 

 Ariya Inokuchi

References

External links
 Ebara official site 
  Wiki collection of bibliographic works on Ebara Corporation

Manufacturing companies based in Tokyo
Companies listed on the Tokyo Stock Exchange
Manufacturing companies established in 1912
Japanese companies established in 1912
Japanese brands
Pump manufacturers
Steam turbine manufacturers
Engine manufacturers of Japan